The Colonel-pilot Milenko Pavlović Air Base, commonly known as Batajnica Air Base  is the main military air base of Serbia. It is located between Batajnica and Nova Pazova, about 25 km northwest from the center of Belgrade, Serbia. It is the only airport in Serbia with two runways.

History
Construction of the airbase started in 1947 and was completed in 1951, when the airbase was officially opened with one grass and two asphalted runways. The purpose of the airbase is to protect the capital Belgrade from aircraft attacks. It was known as 177th Air Base until the 2006 reorganization and was home of 204th Fighter-Aviation regiment, 138th Transport-Aviation Regiment and other units of Yugoslav Air Force.

During the 1999 NATO bombing of Yugoslavia the airbase was heavily bombed for 25 days and sustained heavy damage.

In 2019, Batajnica Air Base officially changed its name to Colonel-pilot Milenko Pavlović Air Base, in honor of Milenko Pavlović, a pilot killed during the 1999 NATO bombing of Yugoslavia.

Units

The base is the home station of the following Serbian Air Force and Air Defence units: 
  204th Air Brigade
  101st Fighter Squadron "Knights"
  138th Transport Squadron
  252nd Training Squadron "Ušće Wolves"
  890th Mixed Helicopter Squadron "Pegasuses"
 177th Air Force Air Defence Artillery Battalion
 24th Air Technical Battalion
 17th Air Base Security Battalion
 Aeronautical Overhaul Institute "Moma Stanojlović"

The air base also houses Air Force and Air Defence Training Center of the Training Command as well as the Center for Flight Tests of the Technical Testing Center.

References

External links

Batajnica Airport map*
Batajnica Airbase pre-strike with visible control tower

1951 establishments in Yugoslavia
Airports in Serbia
Military airbases established in 1951
Serbian Air Force and Air Defence bases
Transport in Belgrade
Syrmia
Yugoslav Air Force bases
Motorsport venues in Serbia